Arvell Jones (whose earliest work is billed Arvell Malcolm Jones)  is an American comics artist best known for his work for Marvel Comics and for DC Comics and its imprint Milestone Media.

Biography
Jones and his brother, Desmond, were raised in Detroit, Michigan, and were both active in early comic book fandom. Along with fellow Detroiters and future comics professionals Rich Buckler, Tom Orzechowski, Keith Pollard, Jim Starlin, Al Milgrom, Michael Netzer, and others, Jones worked on the Detroit Triple Fan Fair, one of the earliest comic book conventions, and published the local fanzine Fan Informer; it lasted into  1971. Jones in 2006 recalled how he and his compatriots "would take a 13-hour drive and spend the night with Al Milgrom and his roommate, hang at Rich [Buckler]'s, then go see [art director] John Romita at Marvel, get our butts spanked, and go back to Detroit to work on our samples again."

Jones entered the comics industry as an assistant for Buckler, the first of the Detroit group to enter the field professionally. After helping Buckler on the Black Panther and the Buckler-created cyborg antihero Deathlok, Jones received his first published credit, for art assistance, along with Pollard, on the Buckler-pencilled Thor #228 (cover dated October 1974). He then did pencil "breakdowns"—layouts that break down the plot elements—for all but page one of the 18-page team-up story "The Return of the Living Eraser", starring the Thing and Morbius, the Living Vampire, for Dick Giordano's finished pencils. This eventually ran in Marvel Two-in-One #15 (May 1976).  After drawing a spot illustration for the text story "The Atomic Monster" in the Marvel black-and-white horror magazine Monsters Unleashed #9 (Dec. 1974), Jones made his debut as penciller of an 18-page story starring the martial artist superhero Iron Fist in Marvel Premiere #20 (January 1975). He also pencilled the next two Iron Fist stories and co-created the supporting character Misty Knight with writer Tony Isabella. Jones also worked on Iron Man starting with issue #73.

When he moved to DC Comics, Jones worked with writer Gerry Conway on Super-Team Family, which teamed the Atom with various other DC characters. After that title's cancellation, a Supergirl/Doom Patrol team-up drawn by Jones, originally scheduled to appear in Super-Team Family was published in The Superman Family #191–193.

Jones worked on the DC series All-Star Squadron in the mid-1980s, penciling the majority of the issues between 1985 and 1987. He left the comics field for several years to work in television, and focused on graphic design work. Jones returned to comics in 1994 to pencil Marvel Comics' Captain America Annual #13, and issues of DC/Milestone Media's Kobalt, Hardware, and Blood Syndicate. His last published comic was Marvel's Daredevil #343 (Aug. 1995), on which he and Keith Pollard did breakdowns, with finished pencils by Tom Palmer.

Bibliography

DC Comics

 All-Star Squadron #37, 41–46, 50–55, 57–60, 67 (1984–1987)
 DC Special #28 (Legion of Super-Heroes) (1977)
 DC Special Series #6 (Secret Society of Super Villains) (1977)
 Men of War #2–3 (Codename: Gravedigger) (1977)
 Secret Origins vol. 2 #19 (Guardian) (1987)
 Superboy and the Legion of Super-Heroes #241–242 (1978)
 The Superman Family #191–193 (Supergirl) (1978–1979)
 Super-Team Family #12–15 (1977–1978)
 Who's Who: The Definitive Directory of the DC Universe #16 (1986)

Milestone Media
 Blood Syndicate #4 (1993)
 Hardware #9 (1993)
 Kobalt #1–6 (1994)

Marvel Comics

 Astonishing Tales #30 (Deathlok) (1975)
 The Avengers #192 (1980)
 Captain America Annual #13 (1994)
 Daredevil #343 (1995)
 G.I. Joe: A Real American Hero #62 (1987)
 Iron Man #73–75, 77 (1975)
 Marvel Premiere #20–22 (Iron Fist) (1975)
 Marvel Spotlight #33 (Deathlok) (1977)
 Marvel Two-in-One #15 (The Thing and Morbius, the Living Vampire) (1976)
 Monsters Unleashed #9 (1974)
 Nightmask #5 (1987)
 Official Handbook of the Marvel Universe Deluxe Edition #12 (1986)
 Power Man #30 (1976)
 Star Brand #8 (1987)
 Super-Villain Team-Up #17 (1980)
 Thor #228, 290 (1974–1979)
 What If...? #37 (The Thing) (1983)

References

External links
 
 
 
 Arvell Jones at Toons Mag
 Arvell Jones at Mike's Amazing World of Comics
 Arvell Jones at the Unofficial Handbook of Marvel Comics Creators

Audio/video
 "Kids Read Comics Interview - Arvell Jones Bonus Story", TGTWebcomics, YouTube, June 23, 2010
 "Arvell Jones Interview!", The Comic Book Syndicate, YouTube, April 30, 2011

20th-century American artists
21st-century American artists
African-American comics creators
American comics artists
American comics creators
Artists from Detroit
DC Comics people
Living people
Marvel Comics people
Year of birth missing (living people)